"I'm Not Built That Way" is a song written by Don Pfrimmer and George Teren, and recorded by American country music artist Billy Dean.  It was released in August 1993 as the third single from the album Fire in the Dark.  The song reached #34 on the Billboard Hot Country Singles & Tracks chart.

Chart performance

References

1993 singles
Billy Dean songs
Song recordings produced by Jimmy Bowen
Liberty Records singles
Songs written by Don Pfrimmer
1993 songs
Songs written by George Teren